3390 or variant, may refer to:

In general
 A.D. 3390, a year in the 4th millennium CE
 3390 BC, a year in the 4th millennium BCE
 3390, a number in the 3000 (number) range

Other uses
 3390 Demanet, an asteroid in the Asteroid Belt, the 3390th asteroid registered
 Nokia 3390, a cellphone
 IBM 3390, a hard disk drive unit
 Texas Farm to Market Road 3390, a state highway

See also

 , a WWI U.S. Navy cargo ship